Chris Haffey (born January 7, 1985 in Whately, Massachusetts) is an American aggressive inline skater.

Biography
Like many inline skaters Chris Haffey began rollerskating as a child and by the age of 11 switched to single row inline skates. Upon moving to Atlanta he was introduced to the Aggressive skating discipline, through ice hockey before returning to California.

While in California, Chris Haffey was submerged in the culture of California's aggressive skating scene by former professional turned producer, Brian Bell, and through him met skating industry leader Kato Mateu. The two became good friends as Kato sponsored many of Haffey's moves through his company Remz.

Haffey was casually skating street until 2004 when he won the ASA finals and began competing regularly on the amateur and professional circuits. This was a turning point for him and his importance in the sport grew as he consistently placed in podium positions thereafter, escalating him to the ranks of pioneers in the sport before him such as Arlo Eisenberg, Aaron Feinberg, or Brian Shima.

Long Shunned by the action sports community at large Haffey's talent and professionalism has popularised street style rollerblading back to the action sports community by being included in press releases by ESPN as member of "Team USA".  
He is credited by many as the individual who has spawned the renaissance in aggressive skating with the consistency of his performances. This is also the reason why he is sought after by many sponsors and events outside the industry. One example of this is his participation in the Nitro Circus Live Tour, where was cited as the 'best rollerblader in the world' for their Las Vegas Show 
 
His most recent achievement was winning first place at the X-Games in the Aggressive Inline Street category. On December 9, 2011  Haffey broke the world record for longest jump ever done on inline skates. Aided by a ramp and a cable-system, Haffey jumped 30 meters in the air and landed successfully on skates. The event took place at an extreme sports event called AIR F.I.S.E in Marseille.

Competition titles
2002 – 1st Atlanta IMYTA
2002 – 1st Detroit IMYTA
2003 – 1st  Puerto Rico IMYTA Final Four
2003 – 2nd Eisenbergs Hoedown
2004 – 1st Barn Burner 
2004 – 1st LG World Championships
2004 – 1st Eisenbergs Hoedown
2005 – 2nd LG World Tour Munich
2005 – 1st LG World Tour Paris
2005 – 1st LG World Championships
2005 – 1st Barn Burner 
2005 – 2nd Eisenbergs Hoedown
2006 – 1st Barn Burner 
2006 – 1st (tie) SDSF OPEN Escondido
2006 – 1st Australian Championships
2006 – 2nd Asian X Games
2006 – 1st Asian X Games Best Trick 
2007 – 2nd Barn Burner 
2007 – 1st LG World Championships
2007 – 1st Eisenbergs Hoedown
2007 – 2nd Asian X Games 
2007 – 1st AIL WorldFinals WoodwardW
2007 – 2nd Bitter Cold Showdown
2007 – 1st SDSF OPEN Escondido 
2008 – 3rd Bitter Cold Showdown
2008 – 2nd NASS
2008 – 1st SDSF OPEN
2009 – Gold XGames Shanghai
2010 – 1st Bitter Cold Showdown
2011 – Gold XGames Shanghai

Filmography
2 Feet
Barely Dead
CHARG!NG
Coup d'état (USD)
Demode
Drip Drop
Fade Nation 
KFC 3 "straight jacket"
Killer Boots 
Leading the Blind
Noir
On top
Pariah
Regardless
Rejects Issue 5
Shred Till Your Dead I & II
Street Dwellaz 1, 2, & 3
United Front
US
VG20
W.A.R. - We Are Rollerbladers (directed by Tyler Shields)

References

External links
The World Rolling Series
www.chris-haffey.com

Aggressive inline skaters
Living people
1985 births
American roller skaters
People from Franklin County, Massachusetts